Fasting is the abstention from eating and sometimes drinking. From a purely physiological context, "fasting" may refer to the metabolic status of a person who has not eaten overnight (see "Breakfast"), or to the metabolic state achieved after complete digestion and absorption of a meal. Metabolic changes in the fasting state begin after absorption of a meal (typically 3–5 hours after eating).

A diagnostic fast refers to prolonged fasting from 1 to 100 hours (depending on age) conducted under observation to facilitate the investigation of a health complication, usually hypoglycemia. Many people may also fast as part of a medical procedure or a check-up, such as preceding a colonoscopy or surgery, or before certain medical tests. Intermittent fasting is a technique sometimes used for weight loss that incorporates regular fasting into a person's dietary schedule. Fasting may also be part of a religious ritual, often associated with specifically scheduled fast days, as determined by the religion.

Health effects 

Fasting may have different results on health in different circumstances. To understand whether loss of appetite (anorexia) during illness was protective or detrimental, researchers in the laboratory of Ruslan Medzhitov at Yale School of Medicine gave carbohydrate to mice with a bacterial or viral illness, or deprived them of carbohydrate. They found that carbohydrate was detrimental to bacterial sepsis. But with viral sepsis or influenza, nutritional supplementation with carbohydrates was beneficial, decreasing mortality, whereas denying glucose to the mice, or blocking its metabolism, was lethal. The researchers put forth hypotheses to explain the findings and called for more research on humans to determine whether our bodies react similarly, depending on whether an illness is bacterial or viral.

Alternate-day fasting (alternating between a 24-hour "fast day" when the person eats less than 25% of usual energy needs, followed by a 24-hour non-fasting "feast day" period) has been shown to  improve cardiovascular and metabolic biomarkers similarly to a calorie restriction diet in people who are overweight, obese or have metabolic syndrome.  

A 2021 review found that moderate alternate-day fasting for two to six months was associated with reductions of body weight, body mass index, and cardiometabolic risk factors in overweight or obese adults.

Medical application 

Fasting is always practised prior to surgery or other procedures that require general anesthesia because of the risk of pulmonary aspiration of gastric contents after induction of anesthesia (i.e., vomiting and inhaling the vomit, causing life-threatening aspiration pneumonia). Additionally, certain medical tests, such as cholesterol testing (lipid panel) or certain blood glucose measurements require fasting for several hours so that a baseline can be established. In the case of a lipid panel, failure to fast for a full 12 hours (including vitamins) will guarantee an elevated triglyceride measurement.

Mental health 
In one review, fasting improved alertness, mood, and subjective feelings of well-being, possibly improving overall symptoms of depression, and boosting cognitive performance.

Weight loss 

Intermittent fasting for periods shorter than 24 hours has been shown to be effective for weight loss in obese and healthy adults and to maintain lean body mass.

Complications 

In rare occurrences, dry fasting can lead to the potentially fatal refeeding syndrome upon reinstatement of food intake due to electrolyte imbalance.

Historical medical studies 
Scientists have studied populations under famine conditions, and hunger strikes. Data from the Second World War suggests fasting inhibits atherosclerosis. This data led to the alternative name of "starvation diet", as a diet with 0 calories intake per day.

Other effects 

It has been argued that fasting makes one more appreciative of food, and possibly drink.

Political application 
Fasting is often used to make a political statement, to protest, or to bring awareness to a cause. A hunger strike is a method of non-violent resistance in which participants fast as an act of political protest, or to provoke feelings of guilt, or to achieve a goal such as a policy change. A spiritual fast incorporates personal spiritual beliefs with the desire to express personal principles, sometimes in the context of social injustice.

The political leader Gandhi undertook several long fasts as political and social protests. Gandhi's fasts had a significant impact on the British Raj and the Indian population generally.

In Northern Ireland in 1981, a prisoner, Bobby Sands, was part of the 1981 Irish hunger strike, protesting for better rights in prison. Sands had just been elected to the British Parliament and died after 66 days of not eating. 100,000 people attended his funeral, and the strike ended only after nine other men died. In all, ten men survived without food for 46 to 73 days.

César Chávez undertook several spiritual fasts, including a 25-day fast in 1968 promoting the principle of nonviolence and a fast of 'thanksgiving and hope' to prepare for pre-arranged civil disobedience by farm workers. Chávez regarded a spiritual fast as "a personal spiritual transformation". Other progressive campaigns have adopted the tactic.

Religious views 

Fasting is practiced in various religions. Examples include Lent in Christianity; Yom Kippur, Tisha B'av, Fast of Esther, Tzom Gedalia, the Seventeenth of Tamuz, and the Tenth of Tevet in Judaism. Muslims fast during the month of Ramadan each year. The fast includes refraining from consuming any food or liquid from sun up until sundown. 

Details of fasting practices differ.  Eastern Orthodox Christians fast during specified fasting seasons of the year, which include not only the better-known Great Lent, but also fasts on every Wednesday and Friday (except on special holidays), together with extended fasting periods before Christmas (the Nativity Fast), after Easter (the Apostles Fast) and in early August (the Dormition Fast). Members of the Church of Jesus Christ of Latter-day Saints (Mormons) generally abstain from food and drink for two consecutive meals in a 24-hour period on the first Sunday of each month. 

Like Muslims, they refrain from all drinking and eating unless they are children or are physically unable to fast. Fasting is a feature of ascetic traditions in religions such as Hinduism and Buddhism. Mahayana traditions that follow the Brahma's Net Sutra may recommend that the laity fast "during the six days of fasting each month and the three months of fasting each year". Members of the Baháʼí Faith observe a Nineteen Day Fast from sunrise to sunset during March each year.

In alternative medicine 

Although practitioners of alternative medicine promote "cleansing the body" through fasting, the concept of "detoxification“ is marketing myth with few scientific basis for its rationale or efficacy.

During the early 20th century, fasting was promoted by alternative health writers such as Hereward Carrington, Edward H. Dewey, Bernarr Macfadden, Frank McCoy, Edward Earle Purinton, Upton Sinclair and Wallace Wattles. All of these writers were either involved in the natural hygiene or new thought movement. Arnold Ehret's pseudoscientific Mucusless Diet Healing System espoused fasting.

Linda Hazzard, a notable quack doctor, put her patients on such strict fasts that some of them died of starvation. She was responsible for the death of more than 40 patients under her care.

In 1911, Upton Sinclair authored The Fasting Cure, which made sensational claims of fasting curing practically all diseases, including cancer, syphilis, and tuberculosis. Sinclair has been described as "the most credulous of faddists" and his book is considered an example of quackery. In 1932, physician Morris Fishbein listed fasting as a fad diet and commented that "prolonged fasting is never necessary and invariably does harm".

See also 

 Angus Barbieri's fast
 Anorexia mirabilis
 Anorexia nervosa
 Asceticism
 Autophagy
 Black Fast
 Break fast
 Calorie restriction
 Fasting and longevity
 Fasting in Jainism
 Force-feeding
 Inedia
 Ketosis
 List of diets
 List of fasting advocates
 List of ineffective cancer treatments
 Poustinia
 Protein-sparing modified fast
 Santhara
 Simple living
 Starvation
 Starvation response
 Superstition#Superstition and psychology
 Taboo food and drink
 Vegetarianism and religion
 Weight loss

References

Further reading 
 Francis Gano Benedict. (1915). A Study of Prolonged Fasting. Carnegie Institution of Washington.

 Joan Jacobs Brumberg. (1988). Fasting Girls: The Emergence of Anorexia Nervosa As a Modern Disease. Harvard University Press.
 Caroline Walker Bynum. (1987). Holy Feast and Holy Fast: The Religious Significance of Food to Medieval Women. University of California Press. 
 John Arthur Glaze. (1928). Psychological Effects of Fasting. American Journal of Psychology 40 (2): 236–253.
 A. M. Johnstone. (2007). Fasting – the ultimate diet?. Obesity Reviews 8 (3): 211–222.
 Walter Vandereycken, Ron Van Deth. (2001). From Fasting Saints to Anorexic Girls: The History of Self-Starvation. Bloomsbury Academic.

External links 

 
 
 
 

 
Asceticism
Biologically-based therapies
Diets
Eating behaviors
Fad diets
Naturopathy
Religious food and drink